Leopold Henzl (18 October 1910 – 3 May 1969) was an Austrian footballer. He played in one match for the Austria national football team in 1931.

References

External links
 

1910 births
1969 deaths
Austrian footballers
Austria international footballers
Place of birth missing
Association footballers not categorized by position